SIIMA Award for Best Debut Director – Telugu is presented by Vibri media group as part of its annual South Indian International Movie Awards, for best film direction done by an debut director in Telugu films. The award was first given in 2012 for films released in 2011.

Superlatives

Winners

Nominations 

 2011: B. V. Nandini Reddy – Ala Modalaindi
 Santosh Srinivas – Kandireega
 Venu Sree Raam – Oh My Friend
 Veerabhadram Chowdary – Aha Naa Pellanta
 Ajay Bhuyan – Dhada
 2012: Maruthi – Ee Rojullo
 Tanikella Bharani – Midhunam
 Balaji Mohan – Love Failure
 Ohmkar – Genius
 Kranthi Madhav – Onamalu
 2014: Sujeeth – Run Raja Run
 Sripriya – Drushyam
 Chandoo Mondeti – Karthikeya
 K. S. Ravindra – Power
 Srinivas Avasarala – Oohalu Gusagusalade
 2015: Anil Ravipudi – Pataas
 Karthik Ghattamaneni – Surya vs Surya
 Radha Krishna Kumar – Jil
 Nag Ashwin – Yevade Subramanyam
 Sriram Aditya– Bhale Manchi Roju
 2016: Tharun Bhascker Dhaassyam – Pelli Choopulu
 G. Naga Koteswara Rao - Nirmala Convent
 K. V. Dayanand Reddy - Siddhartha
 Kalyan Krishna Kurasala – Soggade Chinni Nayana
 Ravikanth Perepu – Kshanam
 2017: Sandeep Vanga – Arjun Reddy 
 Mahi V. Raghav – Anando Brahma
 Prabhakar Podakandla – Next Nuvve
 Sankalp Reddy – Ghazi
 Vivek Athreya – Mental Madhilo
 2018: Ajay Bhupathi – RX 100
 Rahul Ravindran – Chi La Sow
 Venky Atluri – Tholi Prema
 Venky Kudumula – Chalo
 Venu Udugula – Needi Naadi Oke Katha
2019: Swaroop RSJ – Agent Sai Srinivasa Athreya
Venkat Ramji – Evaru
Ritesh Rana – Mathu Vadalara
Raj R – Mallesham
Vishwak Sen – Falaknuma Das
2020: Karuna Kumar – Palasa 1978
Subbu – Solo Brathuke So Better
Sandeep Raj – Colour Photo
Sailesh Kolanu – HIT: The First Case
Ramana Teja – Aswathama

References 

South Indian International Movie Awards
Directorial debut film awards